The 1992 Davidson Wildcats football team represented Davidson College as an independent during the 1992 NCAA Division III football season. Led by seventh-year head coach Dave Fagg, the Wildcats compiled an overall record of 5–5.

Schedule

References

Davidson
Davidson Wildcats football seasons
Davidson Wildcats football